Jens Rydgren (born 1969) is a Swedish writer, political commentator and a professor of sociology, at Stockholm University. Specialising in research of political sociology, for many years he has studied populist right-wing parties. In 2002 he defended his thesis Political Protest and Ethno-Nationalist Mobilization: The Case of the French National Front in a debate with Sidney Tarrow of Cornell University. He has appeared as an expert on right wing populist parties, including the Sweden Democrats, in various news media.

External links
Jens Rydgren at LIBRIS

References

Swedish male writers
1969 births
Swedish sociologists
Academic staff of Stockholm University
Swedish political writers
Living people